The Suicide Prevention Action Network USA (SPAN USA) was a 501(c)(3) organization that was founded in 1996 by Gerald and Elsie Weyrauch, whose 34-year-old daughter, Terri, died by suicide. SPAN USA was "dedicated to preventing suicide through public education and awareness, community action and federal, state and local grassroots advocacy."

SPAN's theme was "Opening Minds. Changing Policy. Saving Lives."

SPAN USA was the nation's only suicide prevention organization dedicated to leveraging grassroots support among suicide survivors (those who have lost a loved one to suicide) and others to advance public policies that help prevent suicide. The organization was created to raise awareness, build political will, and call for action with regard to creating, advancing, implementing and evaluating a national strategy to address suicide in the United States. Since the organization was founded, grassroots volunteers and staff have worked in communities, state capitols and in Washington, DC, to advance its public policy response to the problem of suicide in America.

In 2009, SPAN merged with American Foundation for Suicide Prevention to create a public policy program.

2009 SPAN USA Public Policy Priorities

SPAN USA's 2009 Federal Public Policy Priorities:

Funding for the Garrett Lee Smith Memorial Act programs
Reauthorization of the Substance Abuse and Mental Health Services Administration
Veterans and Military Suicide Prevention
Additional funding for the National Violent Death Reporting System (NVDRS)
Support Evidence-Based Suicide Prevention Research Projects at the Agency for Healthcare Research and Quality (AHRQ)

2009 State Public Policy Priorities:

Establish and authorize funding for a statewide office of suicide prevention that includes at least one full-time position and directs its efforts across the life span.
Adoption by state mental health licensing boards of suicide prevention continuing education requirements.
Adoption of state laws that require educational personnel to receive suicide prevention training.

External links
 American Foundation for Suicide Prevention's Website

Mental health support groups
Mental health organizations in Washington, D.C.
Suicide prevention
Organizations established in 1996